Louis John Gatti (7 March 1915 – 16 May 1977) was an  Australian rules footballer who played with South Melbourne and St Kilda in the Victorian Football League (VFL).

Family
The son of Luigi Gatti (1871–1961), and Caroline Gattie (−1944), née de Carle, Louis John Gatti was born at Chiltern, Victoria on 7 March 1915.

He married Muriel Alva Nellie Ball in 1941.

Death
He died at Port Melbourne, Victoria on 16 May 1977.

Notes

References

External links 

1915 births
1977 deaths
Australian rules footballers from Victoria (Australia)
Sydney Swans players
St Kilda Football Club players
Australian people of Italian descent